Stolen Paradise may refer to:

 Stolen Paradise (1940 film), a youth film
 Stolen Paradise (1952 film), an Argentine film
 Stolen Paradise (1951 film), a Mexican drama film
 The Stolen Paradise, a 1917 American silent drama film